Sylvia Robinson (née Vanderpool; May 29, 1935 – September 29, 2011) was an American singer, record producer, and record label executive. Robinson achieved success as a performer on two R&B chart toppers: as half of Mickey & Sylvia with the 1957 single "Love Is Strange", and her solo record "Pillow Talk" in 1973. She later became known for her work as founder and CEO of the hip hop label Sugar Hill Records.

Robinson is credited as the driving force behind two landmark singles in the hip hop genre: "Rapper's Delight" (1979) by the Sugarhill Gang, and "The Message" (1982) by Grandmaster Flash and the Furious Five, both of which she produced. Several publications have dubbed her as "The Mother of Hip Hop". At the 11th Annual Rhythm and Blues Awards Gala in 2000, she received a Pioneer Award for her career in singing and for founding Sugarhill Records and in 2022, she was inducted into the Rock and Roll Hall of Fame in the Ahmet Ertegun Award category for being a major influence on the creative development of hip-hop's early successes  and is the second woman to receive the honor, after Cynthia Weil.

Life and career

Early life 
Robinson was born as Sylvia Vanderpool on May 29, 1935, in Harlem, New York, United States, to Herbert, an immigrant from the Virgin Islands who worked for General Motors, and Ida Vanterpool. Robinson attended Washington Irving High School until dropping out at the age of 14, and began recording music in 1950 for Columbia Records under the stage name "Little Sylvia".

Early career
In 1954, she began teaming up with Kentucky guitarist Mickey Baker, who taught her how to play guitar. In 1956, the duo now known as Mickey & Sylvia, recorded the Bo Diddley and Jody Williams-penned rock single, "Love Is Strange", which topped the R&B chart and reached number eleven on the Billboard pop chart in early 1957. After several more releases including the modestly successful "There Oughta Be a Law", Mickey & Sylvia split up in 1958 and she later married Joseph Robinson. Sylvia restarted her solo career shortly after her initial split from Baker, first under the name Sylvia Robbins. In 1960, Robinson produced the record "You Talk Too Much" by Joe Jones, but she did not receive credit.

In 1961, Mickey & Sylvia recorded more songs together for various labels including their own. Their label was called Willow Records and was distributed by King Records of Cincinnati. That year, Baker provided vocals and Robinson played guitar on Ike & Tina Turner's hit single "It's Gonna Work Out Fine" which earned Ike & Tina their first Grammy nomination. "I paid for the session, taught Tina the song; that's me playing guitar," Robinson said in a 1981 interview with Black Radio Exclusive.

In 1964, frustrated with the music business, Baker moved to Paris.

In 1966, the Robinsons moved to New Jersey where they formed a soul music label, All Platinum Records, the following year, with artist Lezli Valentine, formerly of the Jaynetts, bringing the label its first hit with "I Won't Do Anything". In 1968, the duo signed a Washington, D.C. act named The Moments, who immediately found success with "Not on the Outside". Within a couple of years and with a new lineup, the group scored their biggest hit with "Love on a Two-Way Street" (1970), which Sylvia co-wrote and produced with Bert Keyes and (uncredited) lyrics by Lezli Valentine. Other hits on the label and its subsidiaries, including Stang and Vibration, included Shirley & Company's "Shame, Shame, Shame" (1975), The Moments' "Sexy Mama" and "Look at Me (I'm in Love)", Retta Young's "(Sending Out An) S.O.S." (1975), and the Whatnauts/Moments collaboration, "Girls". Robinson co-wrote and produced many of the tracks, although later she was supported by two members of The Moments, Al Goodman and Harry Ray, as well as locally based producers, George Kerr and Nate Edmonds.

Solo career
In 1972, Robinson sent a demo of a song she had written called "Pillow Talk" to Al Green. When Green passed on it due to his religious beliefs, Robinson decided to record it herself, returning to her own musical career. Billed simply as Sylvia, the record became a major hit, reaching number-one on the R&B chart and crossing over to reach the US Billboard Hot 100 (#3), while also reaching #14 on the UK Singles Chart in the summer of 1973. She was awarded a gold disc by the R.I.A.A. in May 1973, and earned a nomination for the Grammy Award for Best Female R&B Vocal Performance at the 1974 Grammy Awards. "Pillow Talk"'s subtly orgasmic gasps and moans predated those of the 1975 Donna Summer song "Love to Love You Baby". Reviewing Robinson's 1973 debut LP (also titled Pillow Talk), Robert Christgau wrote in Christgau's Record Guide: Rock Albums of the Seventies (1981) that it is "Let's Get It On without production values. Call it underdeveloped if you want; I'll mention that it's unaffected. Including the best peace lyric heard lately, entitled 'Had Any Lately?'"

Robinson recorded four solo albums on the Vibration subsidiary and had other R&B hits including "Sweet Stuff" and "Pussy Cat". "Pillow Talk" was a soulful medium dance number.

Sugar Hill Records
In the 1970s, the Robinsons founded Sugar Hill Records. The company was named after the culturally rich Sugar Hill area of Harlem, an affluent African-American neighborhood in Manhattan, New York City, known as a hub for artists and performers in the early and mid-1900s. The song "Rapper's Delight" (1979), performed by The Sugar Hill Gang, brought rap into the public music arena by attaining one of the first commercially successful hip hop songs and revolutionized the music industry by introducing rap, scratch, and breakdance. Later acts signed to Sugar Hill Records included all-female rap/funk group The Sequence, featuring a teenage Angie Stone (recording as "Angie B"), who had a million-selling hit in early 1980 with "Funk U Up".

In 1982 Sylvia Robinson with Grandmaster Melle Mel, produced the record "The Message", which was performed by Grandmaster Flash and The Furious Five.  The record discussed life in the ghetto and  became one of the most influential tracks of the hip-hop genre. On December 5, 2012, Rolling Stone selected "The Message" as one of the "50 Greatest Hip-Hop Songs of All Time". In order for Rolling Stone to compose this list, the business asked 33 different artists and experts from every genre of music including Busta Rhymes, Boots Riley, The coup, Mike Diamond, from the Beastie Boys and Talib Kweli. Once the votes were in, "The Message" was placed in the number 1 spot on the list. Grandmaster Flash stated "And when that project was on the slate to be done-The message; I'm talking about-she would ask us for a period of time about doing a record having to do with the real life things that happen in the 'hood. And we kind of ducked it for a minute." Without Sylvia Robinson's insistence and pressure there would be no "The Message". This was the first record of its kind, where the DJ who was the cornerstone of Hip hop at the time (1980s) was not involved in creating a track that they performed.

Sugar Hill Records folded in 1985, due to changes in the music industry, the competition of other hip-hop labels, such as Profile and Def Jam and also financial pressures. Robinson, who had by now divorced Joe Robinson, continued her efforts as a music executive, forming Bon Ami Records in 1987. The label was noted for signing the act The New Style, who later left and found success as Naughty by Nature.

Personal life
Robinson was married to businessman Joseph Robinson Sr. (1932–2000) from May 1959 until his death in 2000. Together they had three children, sons Joseph "Joey" Robinson Jr. (1962–2015), Leland Robinson (b. 1965 or 1966) and Rhondo "Scutchie" Robinson (1970–2014). Robinson owned a bar in Harlem, New York named "Joey's Place" after her husband in the 1960s. Robinson also owned another New York bar and nightclub named the Blue Morocco during the mid-1960s.

Death 
Robinson died on the morning of September 29, 2011, at the age of 76, at Meadowlands Hospital in Secaucus, New Jersey due to congestive heart failure.

In popular culture 

In 2003 American electronic musician Moby sampled her song "Sunday" for his song "Sunday (The Day Before My Birthday)".
In the Drunk History episode "American Music" (2014), Sylvia Robinson was portrayed by Retta.
 Sylvia Robinson is allegedly one of the inspirations for the character Cookie Lyon (portrayed by Taraji P. Henson) on the popular Fox television show Empire.
 Robinson is featured on the documentary series Profiles of African-American Success.
 In a March 2015 piece in The New York Times debating U.S. copyright laws, writer M. K, Asante cited the need for artists to return to Mrs. Robinson's mantra of "Don't copy things that are out there... come up with something new, something different."

Biopic 
In 2014, producer Paula Wagner acquired the film rights to Robinson's life story from her son, Joey Robinson, an executive at Sugar Hill Records. Joey (who died in July 2015) was scheduled to executive produce and serve as a consultant on the project, along with rapper Grandmaster Melle Mel, while music executive Robert Kraft was to co-produce the film along with Stephanie Allain. In October 2015, Warner Bros. announced that it would be the studio producing the film, and that Malcolm Spellman and Carlito Rodriguez, two of the writers on Empire, were writing the script. In October 2018, it was announced that Wagner and Warner Bros. were still moving forward with the film, Spellman and Rodriguez had been joined by Tracy Oliver in completing the script, Justin Simien had been attached as the director, and that Oliver would join Robinson's son Leland as executive producers.

Discography

Albums 

1973: Pillow Talk (Vibration VI-126) (US #3)
1975: Sweet Stuff (Vibration VI-127)
1976: Sylvia (Vibration VI-129)
1977: Lay It On Me (Vibration VI-131)
1996: Pillow Talk: The Sensuous Sounds of Sylvia (Rhino R2-71987) (CD compilation)

Singles

Little Sylvia

1951: "Little Boy" / "How Long Must I Be Blue" (Savoy 816)
1952: "I Went To Your Wedding" / "Drive Daddy Drive" (Jubilee 5093)
1952: "A Million Tears" / "Don't Blame My Heart" (Jubilee 5100)
1953: "The Ring" / "Blue Heaven" (Jubilee 5113)
1954: "Fine Love" / "Speedy Life" (Cat 102)

Sylvia Robbins

1960: "Frankie and Johnny" / "Come Home" (Jubilee 5386)
1964: "Don't Let Your Eyes Get Bigger Than Your Heart" / "From The Beginning" (Sue 805)
1964: "Our Love" / "I Can't Tell You" (Sue 106)

Sylvia

1968: "I Can't Help It" / "It's A Good Life" (All Platinum 2303)

Charted singles

References

External links

1935 births
2011 deaths
20th-century African-American women singers
21st-century African-American people
21st-century African-American women
African-American record producers
African-American songwriters
American women hip hop musicians
American funk singers
American music industry executives
American people who self-identify as being of Native American descent
American soul singers
American women record producers
Burials at George Washington Memorial Park (Paramus, New Jersey)
Record producers from New York (state)
Singers from New York City
Songwriters from New York (state)
Sugar Hill Records (hip hop label) artists
Washington Irving High School (New York City) alumni
Women hip hop record producers
African American female guitarists